A list of the tallest structures in Norway. This list contains all types of structures.

References

External links 
 http://skyscraperpage.com/diagrams/?searchID=37735294

Tallest structures in Norway, List of
Norway
Tallest structures